This article is part of the history of rail transport by country series.

Origins

Railways were introduced in Italy  when it was still a divided country.

The first line to be built on the peninsula was the Naples–Portici line, in the Kingdom of the Two Sicilies, which was 7.640 km long and was inaugurated on 3 October 1839, nine years after the world's first "modern" inter-city railway, the Liverpool and Manchester Railway. The following year the firm Holzhammer of Bolzano was granted the "Imperial-Royal privilege" to build the Milano–Monza line (12 km), in the then Kingdom of Lombardy–Venetia, a part of the Austrian Empire.

On request of the Milanese and Venetian industries, but also for the already clear military importance, construction of the Milan–Venice line was begun. In 1842 the Padua-Mestre stretch of 32 km was inaugurated, followed in 1846 by the Milan-Treviglio (32 km) and Padua-Vicenza (30 km), as well as the bridge spanning the lagoon of Venice.

In the Kingdom of Sardinia (comprising Piedmont, Liguria and Sardinia), King Charles Albert ordered on 18 July 1844 the construction of the Turin–Genoa railway, which was inaugurated on 6 December 1853. This was followed by the opening of other sections which connected with France, Switzerland and Lombardy–Venetia.

A locomotive factory was also founded in Genoa, in order to avoid the English monopoly in the field. This became the modern Ansaldo.

In Tuscany, the Duke of Lucca signed the concession for the Lucca–Pisa railway, while, in 1845, the Duchy of Parma began the construction of two lines towards Piacenza and Modena. In the Papal States, Pope Gregory XVI opposed railways but Pope Pius IX took a more liberal view. Some lines were begun in 1846 under Pius IX with the Rome and Frascati Rail Road then the Rome and Civitavecchia Rail Road.

Under unified Italy

At the creation of the unified Kingdom of Italy, railways in the country were the following:

for a total of 2,064 km active railways.
Lines in the Papal States were still under construction, whilst Sicily had its first, short railway only in 1863 (Palermo-Bagheria). The existing lines did not form an organized network: property of the line was state or private, the latter in turn for private or state use. An organic structure began to be created in 1865 with the connection of the existing sections. In order to promote industrial development, the government entrusted the existing lines to five concessionaires:
SFAI (Società per le strade ferrate dell'Alta Italia)
SFR (Società per le strade ferrate romane)
SFM (Società per le Strade Ferrate Meridionali)
Società Vittorio Emanuele
Società Reale delle ferrovie sarde

The war of 1866 caused great disruption to industrial activities, including those of the railway companies, which almost went bankrupt, and state intervention was needed to save them. In 1870 the last remnant of the Papal States was also annexed to Italy: it comprised the railway connection from Rome to Frascati, Civitavecchia, Terni and Cassino (through Velletri).

Other secondary lines were operated by minor companies. After unification, construction of new lines was boosted: in 1875, with the completion of the section Orte-Orvieto, the direct Florence–Rome line was completed, reducing the travel time of the former route passing through Foligno-Terontola. In 1875 a proposal of the Italian government to form a single company out of the existing concessionaires was refused by the Italian Parliament, provoking also the fall of the government. In the meantime the economic situation of the secondary companies continued to get worse, aggravating the failure of the concessionaire regime at a time when in the whole of Europe the tendency to aggregate all railways into a single, state-owned company became predominant. This, among other benefits, fulfilled the transport demands that a strictly profit-oriented policy could not afford.

The Italian government was however slow to react, and only in 1878 and 1880, respectively, the largely deficitaire SFAI and SFR went under state administration.

The convenzioni of 1884
Despite this situation, in 1884 the Italian Parliament issued a commission study in which it was declared preferable a private administration of railways. The Convenzioni (concessions) between Italy and the three main remaining private companies were signed on 23 April 1884 for a period of 60 years. SFM was assigned the lines on the Adriatic Sea (Rete Adriatica, Italian for Adriatic Network), while the Società per le Strade Ferrate del Mediterraneo and the Società delle Ferrovia della Sicilia received, respectively, the Rete Mediterranea (Mediterranean Network, lines facing the Ligurian, Ionian and Tyrrhenian Seas) and the Rete Sicula (Sicilian Network). The companies received in total 8,510 km of railways, under the vigilance of the Ministry of the Public Works, through a General Inspectorate for Railways, which replaced the previous position of the General Royal Commissariate.

However, this move not only failed to improve the situation of railways, hampering the economic development and tourism as well, but worsened it further. Liabilities of the secondary lines greatly exceeded the profits from the few remaining ones, and absorbed all the state subsidies. By the 1880s the Italian railways amounted to 10,510 km.

Ferrovie dello Stato

The move was completed the following year with the acquisition of the remaining SFM network: by then FFSS possessed  of lines, of which 1,917 km with double tracks.

A General Director was appointed, the Piedmontese engineer Riccardo Bianchi, who had held the same position for the Ferrovie Sicule. A General Direction was created, with 13 Central Services and two General Inspectorates, based in Rome. For peripheral operations, eight Compartmental Directions were created.

A capable and respected organizer, he had received a grievous heritage from the previous organizational chaos. The worst problem was the rolling stock: FFSS had 2,664 steam locomotives, 738 with more than 30 years of service; passenger cars were 6,985, mostly older than 30 years; freight cars were  52,778, with one fifth older than 40 years. The first urgent measure was construction in 1905–06 of 567 new locomotives, 1,244 passenger cars (including the first provided with bogies) and 20,263 freight cars.

Under Bianchi, the FFSS rapidly modernised; the semaphore system was introduced; and centralized hydrodynamic switches and signals were added in the main stations, which were updated or built from scratch. Electrification, already used on the lines around Varese and in Valtellina, was expanded, particularly in the north of Italy, using the three-phase AC system.

Bianchi's direction lasted for ten years. Under his successor, ing. De Cornè, the FFSS was involved in the Italian effort in World War I (from 24 May 1915). The company suffered much destruction, and after the end of the conflict, had new problems from the incorporation of lines in the new territories lost by Austria, with different equipment and rules.

Fascist era

The period from 1922 to 1939 was heavy with important construction and modernisation programmes for the Italian railways, which also incorporated  from the Ferrovie Reali Sarde of Sardinia. The most important programme was that of the  Rome-Naples and Bologna–Florence direttissimas ("most direct lines"): the first reduced the travel time from the two cities by an hour and a half; the second, announced proudly as "constructing Fascism", included the second longest tunnel in the world at the time. Electrification on 3,000 V direct current was introduced, which later supplanted the existing three-phase system. Other improvements included automatic blocks, light signals, construction of numerous main stations (Milan Central, Napoli Mergellina, Roma Ostiense and others) and other technical modernisations.

The rolling stock was enhanced from 1933 by DMU and EMU, nicknamed Littorine from the lictorial symbols of the Fascist regime. The Italian EMUs (elettrotreni), in particular, started the traditional vanguard position of Italy in the field: on 6 December 1937 an ETR 200 travelled on the Rome-Naples line at a speed of 201 km/h (125 mph) in the Campoleone-Cisterna section. Two years later the same train reached 203 km/h (126 mph) on the Milan–Florence line.

In this period food trains made up of refrigerated wagons started to run from southern to northern Italy, and abroad.

The Ferrovie dello Stato were moved from the Ministry of Public Works to the newly formed Ministry of Transports.

From World War II to the 1970s
The war left railways in Italy in a disrupted state. Entire lines were out of action and much of the rolling stock destroyed. Thanks to the Marshall Plan, in the following years they could be rebuilt, although the possibility of reorganizing the network was missed due to short-sighted policies. The fundamental line Battipaglia-Reggio Calabria was doubled, while a program of updating of infrastructures, superstructures, services, colour-light signalling and cars was updated or extended. The three-phase lines were gradually turned into standard 3,000 V dc lines.

Increasing numbers of steam locomotives were replaced by electric or diesel ones; in the 1960s also the first unified passenger cars appeared and the first attempts of interoperability with foreign companies were started, culminating in the creation of Trans Europe Express services.

More modern ferries for the service over the Strait of Messina were introduced and, in 1961, a similar service was begun to Sardinia, although not providing transport of railway cars.

High speed projects

In the 1960s, the FS started an innovative project for high speed trains. E.444 locomotives were the first standard locomotives able to reach , while an ALe 601 EMU reached a speed of  during a test. Other EMUs, such as the ETR 220, ETR 250 and ETR 300 were also updated for speeds up to 200 km/h. The braking systems of cars were updated to fit the increased travelling speeds.

On 25 June 1970, construction of the Florence–Rome Direttissima, the first high-speed line in Italy, was started. This included the  bridge over the Paglia river, then the longest in Europe. However, the project was completed only in the early 1990s.

In 1975, a crack program for a widespread updating of the rolling stock was launched. However, as it was decided to put more emphasis on local traffic, this caused a shifting of resources from the ongoing high speed projects, with their subsequent slowing or, in some cases, total abandonment. Therefore, 160 E.656 electric and 35 D.345 locomotives for short-medium range traffic were acquired, together with 80 EMUs of the ALe 801/940 class, 120 ALn 668 diesel railcars. Some 1,000 much-needed passenger and 7,000 new freight cars were also ordered.

From 1980s onwards

The 1980s were a controversial period. Despite the recent efforts, the average age of the rolling stock increased, especially on secondary lines, late running was frequent and the freight sector lost ground in favour of road transportation. The situation started to improve only from the early 1990s, when the first effects of the new high-speed programs launched from the late 1970s began to appear: these included the famous ETR 400 Pendolino, capable of 250 km/h and first used for the Rome-Florence-Bologna-Milan service. These were later replaced by the more advanced ETR 450 and ETR 500, the latter capable of speed up to 300 km/h. Works on the high-speed lines continued, the Rome-Naples being opened in 2005. Other lines are under construction.

In 2000 FS became a holding company which controls various companies, among which is Trenitalia, a limited society. The various services were divided into three different companies for long range (FS Divisione Passeggeri), local range (FS Regionale) and freight (FS Cargo), while numerous other sub-companies were also created. Property of the railway was assigned to RFI (Rete Ferroviaria Italiana) from 2001 (an FS company as well).

Today railways in Italy continue to experience the difficulties and incongruities inherited from past times. Modern high-speed lines, trains and locomotives (E402) are paired by others, especially in southern Italy, in which the transportation speed is still comparable to that of the early 19th century. The freight sector has only recently showed signs of recovery from the long-term depressed state it has lived in through the 20th century. Commuter services are often causes of polemics due to poor services; in several cases necessary lines survive only through support of local authorities.

The liberalization of the market has brought the appearance of only a small number of other companies.

Railways companies certified for operation in Italy

Companies certified to run railways in Italy are

From 2000
Ferrovie dello Stato S.p. A.
Trenitalia S.p. A.

From 2001
Metronapoli S.p. A.
Ferrovie Nord Milano Esercizio S.p. A. 
Rail Traction Company S.p. A.

From 2002
Del Fungo Giera Servizi Ferroviari S.p. A. 
Gruppo Torinese Trasporti S.p. A.(ex SATTI) 
SERFER Servizi Ferroviari S.r.l. 
Hupac S.p. A.

From 2003
Ferrovie Emilia Romagna S.r.l. 
La Ferroviaria Italiana S.p. A. 
Cargo Nord S.r.l. 
Ferrovie Adriatico Sangritana S.r.l.
Sistemi Territoriali S.p. A.
Strade Ferrate del Mediterraneo S.r.l. 
Swiss Rail Cargo Italy S.r.l.

From 2004
SBB Cargo Italia S.r.l. 
Ferrovie Nord Cargo S.r.l.
Azienda Consorziale Trasporti di Reggio Emilia
Ferrovia Alifana e Benevento Napoli S.r.l.
Ferrovie Nord Milano Trasporti S.r.l.

From 2005
Trasporto Ferroviario Toscano S.p. A. (La Ferroviaria Italiana S.p. A.)
Ferrovie Centrali Umbre S.r.l. 
Railion Italia S.r.l. (ex S.F.M.) 
Rail One S.p. A. 
Azienda Trasporti Collettivi e Mobilità S.p. A. 
A.T.C. Bologna S.p. A. 
Monferail S.r.l.

From 2006
SAD - Trasporto Locale S.p.A.
Nord Cargo S.r.l. (ex Ferrovie Nord Cargo S.r.l.)
Arenaways S.p.A.

Tribute
On 3 October 2019 Google celebrated the 180th anniversary of the first Italian railway inauguration with a Google Doodle.

See also

Ferrovie dello Stato
Railway stations in Italy
Trenitalia
Treno Alta Velocità

References

Notes

Bibliography

 
Ferrovie dello Stato Italiane
Italy
Locomotives of Italy